The Chengdu Sports Center or Sichuan Provincial Sports Center is a sports complex with a multiuse stadium in Chengdu, China which is used mostly for soccer matches.

The stadium holds 39,225 and opened on 28 December 1991; it was the home of the Chengdu Blades, a soccer club in China League One, the second tier of the Chinese soccer pyramid.

It was one of the venues for the group stages of the 2007 FIFA Women's World Cup. It hosted six games in total.

The stadium has also held concerts. Past events include Canadian singer Avril Lavigne's Best Damn Tour on September 30, 2008, marking the first time a Western artist performed at the stadium, and also K-pop boy group Big Bang's Made World Tour on August 14, 2015 in front of 30,000 fans.
Mariah Carey played The Elusive Chanteuse Show Tour at October 12, 2014.

It will be used for the opening and closing ceremonies of the 2019 World Police and Fire Games.

References

Buildings and structures in Chengdu
Football venues in Chengdu
2007 FIFA Women's World Cup stadiums
Sport in Chengdu
Sports venues in Sichuan